Stephanie Sy (born January 16, 1977) is an American television news anchor and reporter for the PBS NewsHour.

Youth and education 
Sy was born and raised in southern California. She graduated from the University of Pennsylvania cum laude with a double major in international relations and environmental studies in 1999.

Career

Early career and ABC 
From August 1999 to 2001, Sy was a reporter and fill-in anchor for WBTW in Florence, South Carolina. In September 2001, she joined WTKR in Norfolk, Virginia, as a military reporter. Her reporting from Iraq while embedded in 2003 during the Iraq War led to her hiring by ABC News that year. Sy reported from London for ABC NewsOne until 2006, when she was a New York-based correspondent. In 2007, she became ABC’s Asia Correspondent in Beijing. Sy was transferred to New York in 2009 and remained there until leaving the network in 2012. Other tasks at ABC included occasional fill-in anchoring on World News Now.

Post-ABC 
From 2012 to 2013, Sy was senior editor and correspondent at Everyday Health. In 2013, she joined Al Jazeera America, where she anchored various newscasts, primarily the weekday morning news, and conducted occasional interviews for Talk to Al Jazeera until the network's closure in 2016. Later in 2016, she was a freelance reporter for Yahoo News, primarily doing interviews. Starting around November 2017, she was also a freelancer anchor for CNN and CNN International. She filled in for Maggie Lake on CNN Money. She continued to freelance for Yahoo News and also for CBSN, CBS News's online streaming service.

PBS Newshour 
While working as a freelance journalist, Sy contributed to the PBS NewsHour Weekend. In 2019, she was named anchor for PBS NewsHour West, based at the Walter Cronkite School of Journalism of Arizona State University in Phoenix, and also correspondent for the PBS NewsHour.

Personal life
Sy is married to David Jensen Ariosto, a supervising producer for NPR's All Things Considered. They married on June 17, 2017. Both were previously married. Sy has a daughter from her previous marriage.

Sy is a member of the Carnegie Council for Ethics in International Affairs, a 501(c)3 philanthropic organization committed to international cooperation based in New York City.

References

External links
 
 Interview on reporting from China for ABC News

1977 births
Al Jazeera people
American expatriates in China
American expatriates in Iraq
American expatriates in the United Kingdom
Living people
University of Pennsylvania alumni
CNN people
American women television personalities
Television anchors from New York City
American television reporters and correspondents
American women television journalists
PBS people
21st-century American journalists
21st-century American women